Noel Dunne (born 1948) is an Irish former hurler and Gaelic footballer. He played with club sides Cloughduv and Canovee, divisional side Muskerry and at inter-county level with [[Cork GAA|

Career
Dunne first played hurling with the Cloughduv minor team that won three successive divisional titles in the mid-1960s. He soon progressed to adult level and won a Cork JFC title with sister club Canovee in 1968. Dunne was a member of the Cloughduv junior team and added a Cork JHC title to his collection in 1970. He was also a member of the Muskerry divisional teams as a dual player that year and, after losing the SHC final, won a Cork SFC medal after a defeat of Nemo Rangers. Dunne enjoyed further club success when Canovee-Cloughduv completed an intermediate double in 1973.

Dunne first appeared on the inter-county scene with Cork as a member of the minor team that won the Munster MHC title in 1966. He later progressed to the under-21 team and won consecutive All-Ireland U21HC titles in 1968 and 1969. Dunne spent three season with the Cork junior football team and won three consecutive Munster JFC titles. He was part of the Cork senior hurling team that won National League and Munster SHC honours in 1972. Dunne spent a number of seasons associated with the team and won a second National League title in 1974 before claiming a second Munster SHC medal in 1975.

Honours
Canovee 
Cork Intermediate Football Championship: 1973
Cork Junior Football Championship: 1968
Mid Cork Junior A Football Championship: 1968

Cloughduv
Cork Intermediate Hurling Championship: 1973, 1983
Cork Junior Hurling Championship: 1970
Mid Cork Junior A Hurling Championship: 1967, 1970

Muskerry
Cork Senior Football Championship: 1970

Cork
Munster Senior Hurling Championship: 1972, 1975
National Hurling League: 1971-72, 1973-74
Munster Junior Football Championship: 1970, 1971, 1972
All-Ireland Under-21 Hurling Championship: 1968, 1969
Munster Under-21 Hurling Championship: 1968, 1969
Munster Minor Hurling Championship: 1966

References

1948 births
Living people
Canovee Gaelic footballers
Cloughduv hurlers
Cork inter-county Gaelic footballers
Cork inter-county hurlers
Dual players
Muskerry Gaelic footballers
Muskerry hurlers
UCC hurlers